Ekāgratā ("one-pointedness"; Pali: ekaggatā) is intent pursuit of one object, close and undisturbed  attention.  Yoga emphasises regular practice (Abhyasa) of meditation and self-imposed discipline to acquire .

Overview 
The faculty called  may be increased by integrating the psycho-mental flux ( or variously-directed, discontinuous, and diffuse attention) so that one gains genuine will and a happiness different from the experience of pleasure from sense-objects. It is harder to achieve if the body is in a tiring or uncomfortable posture or if the breathing is improper.

Badarayana's Brahma Sutras (chapter 3) uses the term to mean concentration: it is held to be a quality resulting from practices discussed in the previous chapter, which are briefly mentioned in the Brihadaranyaka Upanishad and Chandogya Upanishad.  

According to the Bhagavad Gita the seeker after Truth should meditate with his mind fixed on the Lord and absorbed in Him. This is ekagrata. The term nityayuktāh refers to devotees who keep their mind fixed on God uninterruptedly.

Patanjali highlights the importance of continuous practice of prescribed methods to gain ekagrata, the state of the meditative mind free of diverted attention etc.; and thereafter explains that:

Attention on a single point of the mind (citta) gives rise to equilibrium of placid states (previously accumulated impressions) and aroused states (present eagerness to gain more knowledge), which are modifications (of the mind). These two states of mind remain unchanged and are brought to the state of stillness.  and dhāraṇā do not differ from each other, or else  is achieving and maintaining .  converges on a particular concept or object. In the state of  there is clarity and right direction: yoga begins with ekagrata and culminates in nirodha, a stillness of consciousness.  gives the ability to see one’s own mind, one starts looking inwards deeply. If  is lost the full power of intention to achieve goals to be achieved is lost. Intentions afflicted by doubts, fears and reactive thoughts break and diffuse the energy of intentions. The mind which is the cause of Sankalpa ('notion')-Vikalpa ('alternative') must be controlled, it must be bound.  assists in keeping one’s own mind bound and still.

See also 
 Dhāraṇā

References 

Hindu philosophical concepts
Yoga concepts
Vaishnavism
Krishna
Meditation
Spiritual practice
Sanskrit words and phrases